Bavaria Germanair was an airline that came into being following the merger of Bavaria Fluggesellschaft and Germanair on 1 January 1977. 

The airline's main area of activity was operating charter flights from German airports to European holiday destinations. The airline ceased to operate and lost its separate identity when it was merged into Hapag-Lloyd Flug on 1 January 1979, which itself much later became part of TUI fly Deutschland.

Fleet
The Bavarian Germanair fleet consisted of the following types of aircraft:

Airbus A300B4
BAC 1-11-400
BAC 1-11-500

Additionally, an order for VFW-Fokker 614 had been cancelled.

External links

Private website depiciting the airline's history.

Defunct airlines of Germany
Airlines established in 1977
Airlines disestablished in 1979
1977 establishments in West Germany
1979 disestablishments in West Germany
German companies established in 1977